John 'Straw' Andrew was a rugby league footballer in Australia’s major competition, the New South Wales Rugby League (NSWRL), during the early 1960s.

Career

Andrew played for the Eastern Suburbs club, playing 38 matches across three seasons from 1960 to 1962. A fullback, 'Straw' was a member of the Easts side that went down to St George in the 1960 NSWRL Grand Final. Andrew had to be stretchered from the field in that match after suffering a broken leg.

In 1962, the fullback experienced an even more severe injury when he broke his neck after being upended and driven head first into the ground in a spear tackle.

He retired from rugby league soon after.

References 

Year of birth missing (living people)
Living people
Australian rugby league players
Sydney Roosters players
Place of birth missing (living people)